Isei Colati (born 23 December 1983) is a Fijian rugby union player. He was named in Fiji's squad for the 2015 Rugby World Cup.

References

External links
 

1983 births
Living people
Fijian rugby union players
Fiji international rugby union players
Sportspeople from Suva